Heaven is the fourth studio album by Shockabilly, released in 1985 by Fundamental Records. It released on CD as Vietnam/Heaven in 1990.

Track listing

Personnel
Adapted from the Heaven liner notes.

Shockabilly
 Eugene Chadbourne – vocals, electric guitar
 Kramer – vocals, organ, tape, bass guitar, horn, production, mixing
 David Licht – percussion

Production and additional personnel
 Kevin Fullen – recording
 Michael Macioce – cover art

Release history

References

External links 
 

1985 albums
Shockabilly albums
Albums produced by Kramer (musician)